Chengdu Second People's Hospital is a transfer station on Line 3 and Line 4 of the Chengdu Metro in China.

Station layout

Gallery

References

Railway stations in Sichuan
Railway stations in China opened in 2015
Chengdu Metro stations